Sun Wenyan (born 27 December 1989) is a Chinese competitor in synchronised swimming. She won a silver medal in team competition at the 2012 Summer Olympics.  At the 2016 Olympics, she won another silver in the team competition, and a silver in the duet event with Huang Xuechen.

References

External links

1989 births
Living people
Sportspeople from Changsha
Synchronized swimmers from Hunan
Chinese synchronized swimmers
Olympic synchronized swimmers of China
Olympic medalists in synchronized swimming
Synchronized swimmers at the 2012 Summer Olympics
Synchronized swimmers at the 2016 Summer Olympics
Synchronized swimmers at the 2020 Summer Olympics
Medalists at the 2012 Summer Olympics
Medalists at the 2016 Summer Olympics
Medalists at the 2020 Summer Olympics
Olympic silver medalists for China
Asian Games medalists in artistic swimming
Artistic swimmers at the 2010 Asian Games
Artistic swimmers at the 2014 Asian Games
World Aquatics Championships medalists in synchronised swimming
Synchronized swimmers at the 2015 World Aquatics Championships
Synchronized swimmers at the 2011 World Aquatics Championships
Synchronized swimmers at the 2009 World Aquatics Championships
Synchronized swimmers at the 2007 World Aquatics Championships
Asian Games gold medalists for China
Medalists at the 2010 Asian Games
Medalists at the 2014 Asian Games
Artistic swimmers at the 2019 World Aquatics Championships